Billy Gowers (born 10 June 1996) is a former professional Australian rules footballer who played for the Western Bulldogs in the Australian Football League (AFL). Having played football at his school, Xavier College and Oakleigh Chargers, he was drafted by the Carlton Football Club with their first selection and fifth overall in the 2015 rookie draft. He spent two years on Carlton's list before he was delisted at the end of the 2016 season without playing a senior AFL match.

In his debut year, Gowers was the leading goal kicker for the Western Bulldogs by kicking 26 goals out of 20 games. He is the son of 1991 Hawthorn premiership player, Andrew Gowers. Gowers was delisted by the Bulldogs at the conclusion of the 2020 AFL season after playing 33 games over his 3 seasons with the club.

After playing 2 seasons with the Southport Sharks in the VFL, Billy returned to Old Xaverians in the VAFA League for the 2023 season where his grandfather Trevor and his father Andrew both played.

References

External links

1996 births
Living people
Western Bulldogs players
Oakleigh Chargers players
Southport Australian Football Club players
Preston Football Club (VFA) players
Australian rules footballers from Victoria (Australia)
People educated at Xavier College